Bart is a commune in the Doubs department in the Bourgogne-Franche-Comté region in eastern France.

Population

See also 
 Communes of the Doubs department

References

External links 

 Pays de Montbéliard website 

Communes of Doubs
County of Montbéliard